Nowa Góra-Łany  is a village in the administrative district of Gmina Krzeszowice, within Kraków County, Lesser Poland Voivodeship, in southern Poland. Between 1975 and 1988 it was in Kraków Voivodeship.

The village has a population of 348.

References

Villages in Kraków County